The 18th Northwest Territories Legislative Assembly in Canada was established by the results of the 2015 Northwest Territories general election on November 23, 2015. It was the 26th sitting of the Assembly in the territory's history. The territory has fixed election date legislation that ensures elections are held every four years on the first Monday in October.

Membership

Executive Council of the Northwest Territories
The Executive Council has six Ministers and a Premier who were elected by the normal members of the Assembly.

References

External links